Chan Wai Lok (Chinese: 陳瑋樂; born 31 May 1996 in Hong Kong) is a Hong Kong professional footballer who is currently a free agent. Chan started his senior career with Hoi King in the Hong Kong Premier League, where he made only one appearance. After that, he moved to another HKPL club Rangers.

References

External links
 "The Selected Road" Chen Weile Continues Football Fire 
 Hong Kong Super League Dream Life and Death Season: Chen Weile: Just follow me and change careers!
 Chen Weile and Chen Baixi: Unforgettable everything about Oktoberfest

Hong Kong footballers
1996 births
Living people
Hoi King SA players
Hong Kong Rangers FC players
Hong Kong Premier League players
Association football midfielders